The inaugural 1895 Southern Intercollegiate Athletic Association football season was the college football games played by the member schools of the Southern Intercollegiate Athletic Association as part of the 1895 college football season. The  association's inaugural season began on October 12, 1895. The first conference game was played on October 26 with North Carolina at Georgia, featuring what some claim is the first forward pass.

The SIAA was founded on December 21, 1894, by Dr. William Dudley, a chemistry professor at Vanderbilt. The conference was originally formed for "the development and purification of college athletics throughout the South".

The Southern Intercollegiate Athletic Association (S. I. A. A.) was one of the first collegiate athletic conferences in the United States.  Twenty-seven of the current Division I FBS (formerly Division I-A) football programs were members of this conference at some point, as were at least 19 other schools. Every member of the current Southeastern Conference except Arkansas and Missouri, as well as six of the 15 current members of the Atlantic Coast Conference plus the University of Texas at Austin, now of the Big 12 Conference (and previously of the now defunct Southwest Conference), formerly held membership in the SIAA.

No conference members claimed a championship. Some publications dubbed North Carolina the SIAA champions for racking up a 3–0–1 road trip against SIAA opponents. Fuzzy Woodruff said Vanderbilt was the undisputed southeastern champion, but Virginia held preeminence in the entire South.

Regular season

SIAA teams in bold.

Week One

Week Two

Week Three

Week Four

Week Five

Week Six

Week Seven

Week Eight

Awards and honors

All-Southerns

HB, sub - Phil Connell Vanderbilt

Notes

References